Saint Ignatius Church is a church on the campus of the University of San Francisco in San Francisco, California. The church serves a parish of the Catholic Archdiocese of San Francisco and is the university's chapel. Saint Ignatius Church is staffed by priests of the Society of Jesus and is dedicated to the Society's founder, Ignatius of Loyola.

Description
The present Saint Ignatius Church is the fifth such church to be built in San Francisco. Its history runs parallel to that of USF: the very first Saint Ignatius was built in 1855 as a small wood-frame church beside a schoolhouse that became Saint Ignatius Academy, USF's predecessor. The Market Street location was later rebuilt as a larger brick church which attracted many of San Francisco's Catholics away from established parishes. This led to a dispute between Saint Ignatius' first pastor, Father Anthony Maraschi, S.J. and Archbishop Joseph Alemany which resulted in the archdiocese stripping Saint Ignatius of its parish status in 1863.

The third Saint Ignatius Church was built, along with Saint Ignatius College, in 1880. The church and college moved from Market Street to the corner of Hayes Street and Van Ness Avenue, on a site now occupied by the Davies Symphony Hall. Compared to the first two churches, the third church could accommodate 4,000 worshippers and was arguably the grandest. However, the third church and college only lasted 25 years as both were destroyed in the 1906 earthquake and fire.

After the earthquake and fire, the college was hastily re-built on Hayes Street, a few miles west of old Van Ness Avenue site. A rambling wooden structure, the high school portion of the new complex was known as "The Shirt Factory" and the buildings would stay there for some two decades. However, the church itself was eventually re-built in 1912 two blocks north on Fulton Street at the corner of Parker Ave., and the fifth Saint Ignatius Church was dedicated in 1914. It has continued to serve as the university's chapel, and in  1994, the Archdiocese of San Francisco reinstated Saint Ignatius' status as a parish, serving the surrounding neighborhood.

The present church's architecture is a mix of Italian Renaissance and Baroque elements, and its floorplan follows that of ancient Roman basilicas. Though Saint Ignatius Church survived the 1989 Loma Prieta earthquake unscathed, it was recently renovated and seismically reinforced. One of the city's largest churches, its location on a hilltop as well as its twin spires and dome makes it a prominent San Francisco landmark. Its backdrop was always the sky of San Francisco only until Salesforce Tower was erected to its east in 2018.

St. Ignatius Church “resurrects” when the Archbishop designates St. Ignatius a parish; the Jesuit Provincial names Father Charles Gagan, long-time San Francisco native, as the third pastor in the church's history.  He immediately began a campaign to replace the roof and fix the dome and cupola; he also commissions new carpeting and flooring for the aisles.  Major repairs were also needed in the electrical and heating services.  With the costly addition of staff for the social outreach, educational, and sacramental programs, fund-raising does not satisfy the need for an endowment to maintain the church and repairs.

The congregation has converted 4 of the alcoves within the church to an art gallery, called the Manresa Gallery. This space has featured a number of Bay Area artists coming from a variety of religious and non religious backgrounds.

See also
 List of Jesuit sites

References

External links
Saint Ignatius Church website

Landmarks in San Francisco
Roman Catholic Archdiocese of San Francisco
Roman Catholic churches in California
University of San Francisco
Jesuit churches in the United States
Roman Catholic churches in San Francisco
Buildings and structures destroyed in the 1906 San Francisco earthquake